Truth or dare? is a party game requiring a minimum of two players.

Truth or Dare may also refer to:

Film and television

"Truth or Dare" (Undeclared episode), 13th episode of Undeclared Season 1
"Truth or Dare" (Hi Hi Puffy AmiYumi episode), Season 3 episode of Hi Hi Puffy AmiYumi
Truth or Dare, 1996 TV drama starring Helen Baxendale.
Truth or Dare? (1986 film), 1986 horror film by Tim Ritter
Madonna: Truth or Dare, 1991 documentary film chronicling Madonna's Blond Ambition World Tour
Truth or Dare: 6th Floor Rear Flat, 2003 Hong Kong film
Truth or Dare (2012 film), a horror film by Robert Heath also known in the United States as Truth or Die
Truth or Dare (2013 film), a horror film by Jessica Cameron
Truth or Dare (2017 film), a horror film by Nick Simon
Truth or Dare (2018 film), a horror film by Jeff Wadlow also known as Blumhouse's Truth or Dare
 "Truth or Dare" (The Walking Dead: World Beyond), an episode of the first season of The Walking Dead: World Beyond

Music

Truth or Dare (Automatic Loveletter album), 2010
Truth or Dare (Oomph! album), 2010 English language compilation album by Neue Deutsche Härte band Oomph!
"Truth or Dare", a song by N*E*R*D from their 2001 album In Search of...
Dare (La La La), a 2014 single by Shakira, originally named "Truth or Dare"

Other uses

Truth or Dare (fragrance), a perfume by Madonna, released in April 2012
Truth or Dare (novel), novel by R. L. Stine, 28th novel in the Fear Street series